SunSetter Products LP is an American manufacturer of awnings and sun shades. SunSetter claims to have approximately a third of the United States awning marketshare.

SunSetter mass-produces and tests its products in a  facility in Malden, Massachusetts.



Products
SunSetter's primary product lines are awnings, but the company also manufactures flagpoles, solar shades, screen rooms, and mats. The company currently produces four different types of deck and patio awnings (including motorized and hand-cranked awnings); customers choose the color and size. Most of their awnings are designed for attachment directly to a structure; the company only manufactures one type of freestanding awning. SunSetter sells most of its products directly, but also uses various third-party distributors.

Advertising
SunSetter's primary television commercial is well known in the United States, having been in rotation since 2005. Only minor updates have been made to the commercial over the years; the initial advertised minimum price was advertised as $398, but was increased to $599, likely to account for inflation.

References

External links
Official website

Manufacturing companies based in Massachusetts
Manufacturing companies established in 1988
Privately held companies based in Massachusetts